"Roll Up" is a song by South African rapper Emtee off his debut studio album, Avery. The song was voted "Song of The Year" at the 2015 South African Hip Hop Awards.

Critical reception
Upon its release, "Roll Up" was met with positive reviews among music critics. With massive airplay, it peaked at #1 on YFM's DJ Speedsta's hip hop charts and also peaked at #2 on the local iTunes hip hop/rap chart.

Roll Up has been downloaded over 500,000 times and RiSA has certified it 3× Platinum

"Roll Up (Re-Up)"
On November 28, 2015, a remix for "Roll Up" titled "Roll Up (Re-Up)" was released. It featured vocal appearances from Wizkid and AKA. The video for "Roll Up (Re-Up)" was shot by Ofentse Mwase Films and RB Films in South Africa and was released on YouTube on December 8, 2015.

Accolades

References

External links

Gangsta rap songs
Hip hop songs
2015 songs
2015 debut singles